Edward Rannell Reynolds (born September 23, 1961) is a retired  National Football League (NFL) league office executive and American football linebacker who played in the NFL for the New England Patriots and New York Giants between 1983 and 1992. He played college football at the University of Virginia. Reynolds also served as an operations and training officer in the U.S. Army Reserve.

In August 2010, Reynolds was named president of Norfolk, Virginia's new United Football League (UFL) franchise, replacing Jim Speros.

In June 2012, Reynolds was named athletic director at Hickory Grove Christian School responsible for overseeing all middle school, junior varsity and varsity sports programs.

Virginia Cavaliers football players
New England Patriots players
New York Giants players
American football linebackers
1961 births
Living people